Üch-Korgon (pronounced), is a large village in Batken Region of Kyrgyzstan. It is part of the Kadamjay District. With the population of 14,708 (2021), it is the largest village in the region. Under Soviet rule the village was named Molotovabad.

There is a river named Isfayram Soy. Isfayram Soy gives its water to the residents of Üch-Korgon, Kyzyl-Kiya and to other villages around Üch-Korgon and flows further to Quvasoy, a town in Uzbekistan. There are 11 schools in Üch-Korgon such as A.S. Pushkin, Ayniy, Jomiy, etc. Most of the population in Üch-Korgon is involved in growing and selling/exporting cherries, pears and tobacco leaves. Cherries of Üch-Korgon, known as "third type cherry," are the most popular and are claimed to be the largest in the world. Cherries ripen late May and early June.

Population

References

External links 
Uch-Korgon — Satellite map at Maplandia.com
 Uchkorgon

Populated places in Batken Region